Stephen Eric Bronner (born 19 August 1949) is a political scientist and philosopher, Board of Governors Professor of Political Science at Rutgers University in New Brunswick, New Jersey, United States, and is the Director of Global Relations for the Center for the Study of Genocide and Human Rights. Bronner has published over 25 books and 200 journal articles.

Early life and education
Born in New York City, New York, United States on 19 August 1949, Bronner earned a Bachelor of Arts (B.A.) at City College of New York, spent a year at the Universität Tübingen in Germany on a Fulbright-Hays Fellowship in 1973, and completed his Master of Arts (M.A.) and Doctor of Philosophy (Ph.D.) in Political Science from the University of California, Berkeley in 1976.

Career
Bronner has been employed at Rutgers University since 1976, and has held visiting professor positions at the New School for Social Research (1989) the Universität Leipzig (1998).

Bronner is Director of Global Relations at the Center for the Study of Genocide and Human Rights at Rutgers University, and the Executive Chair of US Academics for Peace and an advisor to Conscience International. His activities in civic diplomacy led him to audiences with presidents and high ranking political dignitaries in Iran, Iraq, Palestine, Syria, Sudan, Darfur, Ukraine, and Russia. Some of these experiences are discussed in his books dealing with the internal politics of these nations in Blood in the Sand (2005), Peace out of Reach (2007), and The Bitter Taste of Hope (2017). Invitations to speak at universities and conferences all over the United States, Japan, China and South Africa have been numerous.

Bronner is a contributing editor at Logos and on the editorial board of other journals. His various works include studies of contemporary political theory, political history, and cultural politics.

In 2018, Bronner was accused of sexual assault by students and colleagues. After Rutgers University reversed their decision not to investigate, they put Bronner on a paid research sabbatical until their investigation is over. Bronner claims that none of the alleged assaults happened. Campus officials "found no proof he violated any school policies."

Theoretical contributions
Influenced by critical theory, existentialism, and liberal socialism, Bronner is best known for his reinterpretation of tradition and a host of concepts like the class ideal and the cosmopolitan sensibility. He is perhaps the foremost contemporary proponent of developing the linkage of political theory with practical and progressive political concerns. His work is discussed in Rational Radicalism and Political Theory: Essays in Honor of Stephen Eric Bronner, ed. by Michael J. Thompson (Lanham: Lexington Books, 2010).

Awards and honors

Bronner was the recipient of the MEPeace Award by the Network for Middle Eastern Politics in 2011. Along with various teaching awards, he received the Michael A. Harrington Prize for Moments of Decision (1991) and Honorable Mention for the David Easton Prize, which honored the best work of political theory of the last five years, for Reclaiming the Enlightenment. Bronner received the Charles McCoy Lifetime Achievement Prize from the American Political Science Association in 2005.

Bibliography

Scholarly works
The Bigot: Why Prejudice Persists (Yale University Press, 2014) 
Modernism at the Barricades: Aesthetics, Politics, Utopia (Columbia University Press, 2012) 
Critical Theory: A Very Short Introduction (Oxford University Press, 2011) 
Peace Out of Reach: Middle Eastern Travels and the Search for Reconciliation (The University Press of Kentucky, 2007) 
Blood in the Sand: Imperial Fantasies, Right-Wing Ambitions, and the Erosion of American Democracy (The University Press of Kentucky, 2005) 
 Reclaiming the Enlightenment: Toward a Politics of Radical Engagement (New York: Columbia University Press, 2004). . Translation into Spanish: Reivindicación de la Ilustración, Pamplona, Laetoli, 2008. .
 A Rumor about the Jews: Anti-Semitism. Conspiracy, and the Protocols of Zion (Paperback Edition–New York: Oxford University Press, 2004; Hardcover Edition–New York: St. Martin’s Press, 2000; Translation into German–Berlin: Propylaen Verlag, 2000). ; Translation into Spanish: Un rumor sobre los judíos, Pamplona, Laetoli, 2009. .
 Imagining the Possible: Radical Politics for Conservative Times (New York: Routledge, 2002). 
 Of Critical Theory and Its Theorists (2nd Edition–New York: Routledge, 2002; 1st Edition–London: Basil Blackwell, 1994; Translation into Portuguese–Rio de Janeiro: Papirus, 1997). 
 Socialism Unbound (2nd Edition:–Boulder, Colorado: Westview Press, 2000; 1st edition–New York: Routledge, 1990). 
 Ideas in Action: Political Tradition in the Twentieth Century (Lanham, Maryland: Rowman & Littlefield, 1999; Translation into Korean–Seoul, Korea: Ingansarang Publishers, 2003). 
 Camus: Portrait of a Moralist (Minneapolis: University of Minnesota Press, 1999; Translation into German–Berlin: Verlag Vorwerk 8, 2002). 
 Moments of Decision: Political History and the Crises of Radicalism (New York: Routledge, 1992; Translation into German–Frankfurt am Main: Suhrkamp Verlag, 2000). 
 Rosa Luxemburg: A Revolutionary for Our Times (3rd printing– Pennsylvania State University Press, 1997; 2nd printing–New York: Columbia University Press, 1987; 1st printing–London: Pluto Press, 1980).

Popular works
 Albert Camus: The Thinker, The Artist, The Man (New York: Franklin Watts, 1996). 
 Leon Blum (New York: Chelsea House Publishing Co., 1986). 
 A Beggar’s Tales (New York: Pella Press, 1978). NO ISBN.
 Afterword for Will Eisner's graphic novel, The Plot (New York: W. W. Norton, 2005).

Edited works
 The Logos Reader: Rational Radicalism And the Future of Politics (with Michael J. Thompson) (University Press of Kentucky, 2005).  
 Planetary Politics: Human Rights, Terror, and Global Society (Lanham, Maryland: Rowman & Littlefield, 2005). 
 Twentieth Century Political Theory: A Reader (Revised 2nd Edition–New York: Routledge, publication pending 2004; 1st Edition, 1996). 
 Vienna: The World of Yesterday 1889-1914, co-edited with F. Peter Wagner, (Atlantic Highlands, New Jersey: Humanities Press International, 1997). 
 The Letters of Rosa Luxemburg, edited, translated, and with an introduction (2nd edition–Atlantic Highlands, New Jersey: Humanities Press International, 1993; 1st edition–Boulder, Colorado: Westview Press, 1979). 
 Critical Theory and Society, co-edited with Douglas Kellner,(New York: Routledge, 1989). 
 Socialism in History: Political Essays of Henry Patcher (New York: Columbia University Press, 1984). 
 Passion and Rebellion: The Expressionist Heritage co-edited with Douglas Kellner (2nd printing–New York: Columbia University Press, 1988; 1st printing– South Hadley, Massachusetts: Bergin & Garvey; New York: Universe Books; and London: Croom Helm, 1983).

Series editor
 "Critical Political Theory and Radical Practice" (New York, NY: Palgrave/Macmillan).
 "Genocide, Atrocity, and Human Rights" (New Brunswick, NJ: Rutgers University Press).
 "Polemics" (Lanham, Maryland: Rowman & Littlefield).
 "Interventions: Social Theory and Contemporary Politics" (Boulder, Colorado: Westview Press).''

References

External links
Department of Political Science at Rutgers, The State University of New Jersey
Illuminations - The Critical Theory Project

1949 births
Living people
20th-century American philosophers
21st-century American philosophers
American political writers
American male non-fiction writers
City College of New York alumni
Marxist theorists
Rutgers University faculty
Social philosophers
UC Berkeley College of Letters and Science alumni